The Man Who Was Too Clever is a 1935 mystery detective novel by Anthony Gilbert, the pen name of British writer Lucy Beatrice Malleson. It is the tenth and last in a series of novels featuring her amateur detective and politician Scott Egerton. The following year she introduced a new character, the unscrupulous solicitor Arthur Crook, in Murder by Experts.

Synopsis
Helen Paget is found shot dead in a private room of the Apsley Hotel in London. Her murderer has developed a very complex plot to commit the killing without being caught, but he is too clever for his own good.

References

Bibliography
 Magill, Frank Northen . Critical Survey of Mystery and Detective Fiction: Authors, Volume 2. Salem Press, 1988.
Murphy, Bruce F. The Encyclopedia of Murder and Mystery. Springer, 1999.
 Reilly, John M. Twentieth Century Crime & Mystery Writers. Springer, 2015.

1935 British novels
British mystery novels
British thriller novels
Novels by Anthony Gilbert
Novels set in London
British detective novels
Collins Crime Club books